Gadarwara railway station is a 'B' Category railway station under West Central Railways serving Gadarwara town, in Narsinghpur district of Madhya Pradesh state of India. It is under Jabalpur railway division of West Central Railway Zone of Indian Railways.

Gadarwara is connected by Indian Railways, with the facility of daily running trains for New Delhi, Mumbai, Kolkata, Bhopal, Indore, Jabalpur, Itarsi, Gwalior, Allahabad, Varanasi, Patna, Goa, Coimbatore, Agartala, Atari, Amritsar, Kevadia and several other places in India. The nearest junction is Itarsi (117 km), and another nearby junction is Jabalpur (129 km).

References

Jabalpur railway division
Railway stations in Narsinghpur district